Crash of Rhinos were an English emo band from Derby, England. They were signed to Topshelf Records, To Lose La Track and Big Scary Monsters.

History
Crash of Rhinos was formed in 2009. They released two full-length albums before disbanding in 2014. Their rough punk style echoed earlier emo bands from the 1990s such as Jawbreaker and Burning Airlines.

Band members
Paul Beal (bass, vocals)
Jim Cork (guitar, vocals)
Ian Draper (bass, vocals)
Richard J. "Biff" Birkin (guitar, vocals)
Oli Craven (drums, vocals)

Discography
Studio albums
Distal (2011)
Knots (2013)

References

British emo musical groups
Musical groups established in 2009
Musical groups disestablished in 2014
Topshelf Records artists
Emo revival groups